Société générale means "general company" or "general society" in French, and was included in the name of many legal entities, particularly in the 19th and early 20th centuries, starting with the Société Générale de Belgique in 1822. In contemporary usage, it generally refers to Société Générale, a French banking group, unless context indicates otherwise.

Société Générale Group
 Société Générale (est. 1864), originally the Société Générale pour Favoriser le Développement du Commerce et de l'Industrie en France

Group subsidiaries
 Komerční banka in the Czech Republic
 Societe Generale Ghana
 Société Générale de Banque au Liban (SGBL) in Lebanon
 BRD – Groupe Société Générale in Romania
 Societe Generale bank Montenegro

Former subsidiaries
 Banque de Salonique in the Ottoman Empire
 Banque du Nord in the Russian Empire
 Splitska banka in Croatia, later owned by OTP Bank
 MobiasBanca in Moldova, later owned by OTP Bank
 Société Générale Pakistan, later Meezan Bank
 Rosbank in Russia, sold in 2022
  in Slovenia, later owned by OTP Bank
 Société Générale Yugoslav Bank and Société Générale Srbija, later OTP banka Srbija a.d.

Other links
 , the bank's former head office in downtown Paris
 Tours Société Générale, the group head office in Paris La Défense
 Société Générale Bank Heist, a 1976 bank robbery in Nice
 Baden v Société Générale, a 1983 UK law case
 , a 1980s French financial scandal
 2008 Société Générale trading loss, a financial crisis episode
 Société Générale, London Branch v Geys, a 2012 UK labor law case

Other corporate entities
 Société Générale de Belgique (SGB, est. 1822), later acquired by Suez Lyonnaise
 Société Générale des Minerais (SOGEMIN, est. 1919 in Liège), a mining subsidiary
  (est. 1934), the SGB's banking subsidiary
 Société générale de Crédit mobilier (est. 1852), also known as the Crédit Mobilier
  (SGA, est. 1857), later part of Havas
 Société Générale de Crédit Industriel et Commercial (CIC, est. 1859), also known as the Crédit Industriel et Commercial
 Société Générale de l'Empire Ottoman (SGEA, est. 1864)
 Société Générale Algérienne (SGA, est. 1865), later restructured as Compagnie Algérienne
  (est. 1865), later part of Chargeurs
 Société Générale de Surveillance (SGS, est. 1878), later SGS S.A.
 Société Générale de Chemins de Fer Economiques (est. 1880 in Belgium) and Société Générale Belge d'Entreprises Electriques (est. 1895), both later part of Tractebel
 Société Générale des Chemins de Fer Economiques (est. 1880 in France), later Chemins de fer et transport automobile
 Société Générale de Touage et de Remorquage (est. 1898), later Touax
 Société Générale d'Enterprises (SGE, est. 1899), later part of Vinci SA
 Societé Générale des Voitures Automobiles Otto (est. 1900)
 Société générale suisse des chocolats Peter et Kohler réunis (est. 1904), later part of Nestlé
 Société Générale de Construction Mécaniques (est. 1911), later part of SEMT Pielstick
 Société Générale des Constructions Industrielles et Mécaniques (SGCIM, est. 1918), formerly Etablissements Borel
 Société Générale des Transports Aériens (SGTA, est. 1919), later part of Air France
 Société Générale des Films (est. 1923), producer of movies such as The Passion of Joan of Arc
 Société générale de financement (est. 1962), later merged into Investissement Québec
 Société Générale Congolaise des Minérais (Gecomin, est. 1967), later Société Générale des Carrières et des Mines or Gécamines
  (SGTM, est. 1971)
  (SGN, est. 1978), later part of Orano
 Société Générale du Cinéma du Québec (SGCQ, est. 1982), later Société de développement des entreprises culturelles
 Societe Generale Haitienne de Banque (est. 1986), also known as Sogebank

Non-profit entities
  (est. 1877)
  (est. 1924)
 Société générale de l'industrie horlogère suisse SA (est. 1931), also known by its German name Allgemeine Gesellschaft der Schweizerischen Uhrenindustrie

Notes